Jackson Township is one of the fifteen townships of Hardin County, Ohio, United States. As of the 2010 census the population was 2,098, of whom 498 lived in the unincorporated portions of the township.

Geography
Located in the northerneastern corner of the county, it borders the following townships:
Delaware Township, Hancock County - north
Richland Township, Wyandot County - northeast
Jackson Township, Wyandot County - east
Goshen Township - southeast
Pleasant Township - southwest
Blanchard Township - west

Two villages are located in Jackson Township: Forest in the northeast, and Patterson in the center.

Name and history
Jackson Township was organized in 1836, and named for Andrew Jackson (1767–1845), the seventh President of the United States (1829–1837). It is one of thirty-seven Jackson Townships statewide.

Government
The township is governed by a three-member board of trustees, who are elected in November of odd-numbered years to a four-year term beginning on the following January 1. Two are elected in the year after the presidential election and one is elected in the year before it. There is also an elected township fiscal officer, who serves a four-year term beginning on April 1 of the year after the election, which is held in November of the year before the presidential election. Vacancies in the fiscal officership or on the board of trustees are filled by the remaining trustees.

References

External links
County website

Townships in Hardin County, Ohio
1836 establishments in Ohio
Populated places established in 1836
Townships in Ohio